The Roman Catholic Diocese of San Carlos (Latin: Dioecesis Sancti Caroli Borromeo) is a Roman Rite diocese of the Latin Church of the Catholic Church in the Philippines. The diocese was split off from the Diocese of Bacolod together with the Diocese of Kabankalan in 1987 and is a suffragan diocese of the Archdiocese of Jaro in Iloilo City. The seat of the cathedral is the San Carlos Borromeo Cathedral in San Carlos City, Negros Occidental.

Ordinaries

Auxiliary Bishops

See also
Catholic Church in the Philippines

References

 

San Carlos
San Carlos
Christian organizations established in 1987
Roman Catholic dioceses and prelatures established in the 20th century
Religion in Negros Occidental
San Carlos, Negros Occidental